TVP Dokument is a Polish TVP station, which primarily focuses on presenting documentaries and movies. It started broadcasting on 19 November 2020. It is broadcast only in HD via cable and satellite, as well as DVB-T2/HEVC test transmissions.

External links

References 

Television channels in Poland
2020 establishments in Poland
Television channels and stations established in 2020